Kenwood Estates is a census-designated place (CDP) in Palm Beach County, Florida, United States. Its population was 1,435 as of the 2020 census. Kenwood Estates is located between Greenacres and Palm Springs; State Road 809 (Military Trail) passes through the community. More specifically, the CDP is defined from Attleboro Avenue westward to Haverhill Road, while the community's southern boundary is the L-11 Canal and the northern extent is generally along the southside of 10th Avenue North.

As early as 1925, the Alfred H. Wagg Organization, inc. began advertising the Kenwood development along "the beautiful Pine Ridge of Military Trail" and noting that the area would eventually include a shopping center, apartment complexes, duplexes, and a number of single family homes.

Kenwood Estates has been a priority focus area of the Countywide Community Revitalization Team (CCRT) since the early 2000s. CCRT, established by Board of County Commissioners in 1997, studies and coordinates efforts to improve certain communities in Palm Beach County. Between August 2003 and January 2010, the board approved more than $2.7 million in expenditures to improve Kenwood Estates. Projects undertaken included the addition of a neighborhood park, sidewalks, speed bumps, and streetlights, as well as improvements to drainage and pavement. A community policing deputy was also assigned to the community to restore a sense of security.

Demographics

References

Census-designated places in Palm Beach County, Florida
Census-designated places in Florida